Seydol Crag (‘Seydolski Kamak’ \'sey-dol-ski 'ka-m&k\) is the narrow, rocky ridge extending 2.9 km and rising to 1070 m in the southeast foothills of Detroit Plateau on southern Trinity Peninsula in Graham Land, Antarctica.  It is surmounting the upper course of Sjögren Glacier to the west and south.

The feature is named after the settlement of Seydol in Northeastern Bulgaria.

Location

Maps
 Antarctic Digital Database (ADD). Scale 1:250000 topographic map of Antarctica. Scientific Committee on Antarctic Research (SCAR), 1993–2016.

Notes

References
 Seydol Crag. SCAR Composite Antarctic Gazetteer.
 Bulgarian Antarctic Gazetteer. Antarctic Place-names Commission. (details in Bulgarian, basic data in English)

External links
 Seydol Crag. Copernix satellite image

Mountains of Trinity Peninsula
Bulgaria and the Antarctic